Return of Judge Bao is a 2000 television series produced by Hong Kong's Asia Television starring Jin Chao-chun as the titular Song dynasty official Bao Zheng. Although a Hong Kong production, it was completely filmed in Qingdao, China and featured mostly actors from Taiwan and mainland China. The series was first shown on Taiwan Television in Taiwan in March 2000, and was not broadcast in Hong Kong until May 2000 when the Cantonese-dubbing was complete.

The English title makes references to the 1993 mega-hit Taiwanese TV series Justice Pao, also known as Judge Bao. Four actors, namely Jin, Fan Hung-hsuan, Liu Yueh-ti, and Tu Man-sheng reprised their roles from the classic.

Cast
Jin Chao-chun as Bao Zheng
Fan Hung-hsuan as Gongsun Ce
Vincent Chiao as Zhan Zhao
Zhang Tielin as Emperor Renzong of Song
Xia Yu
Tang Guoqiang
Song Dandan
Wang Yu-wen
Sun Xing
Wu Ma

2000 Hong Kong television series debuts
2000 Hong Kong television series endings
Works based on The Seven Heroes and Five Gallants